Robert Tyler may refer to:

Robert Tyler (American football) (born 1965), American football player
Robert C. Tyler (1832–1865), Confederate general during the American Civil War
Robert O. Tyler (1831–1874), Union general in the American Civil War
Robert Tyler (baseball) (born 1995), American baseball pitcher
Robert Tyler (Confederate Register of the Treasury) (1816–1877), son of United States President John Tyler

See also 
Robert Tyler Davis (1904–1978), American art historian
Peter Robert Tyler Thorburn (1939–2021), New Zealand rugby union player and coach
Sir George Robert Tyler, 1st Baronet (1835–1897), baronet and Lord Mayor of London